Saanich Commonwealth Place is a recreation center located west of the Patricia Bay Highway and north of Royal Oak Drive in Saanich, British Columbia in Canada.  It was originally constructed in 1993 for the August 1994 Commonwealth Games, and is currently a prominent facility in the community.  In 2002 the original weightroom was completely renovated and it re-opened for operation in 2004.  Among the center's other features are a full-size gymnasium (7000 square feet), a 50-meter competition pool, 4.5 meter deep dive tank with 1-, 3-, 5-, 7.5-, and 10-meter boards, and the Bruce Hutchison Branch of the Greater Victoria Public Library.  The building's construction is unique; it features a red dome in the shape of a slightly flattened square pyramid over the main pool area.  The inside of the dome boasts dozens of large, intricately engineered sound absorption ceiling panels.  Finally, stretching from about one-sixth to one-third of the way down the pyramid dome's four massive triangular sides, angled multi-pane windows replace the ceiling panels as the focus of a backstroker's view.  The facility is often referred to as the "Commonwealth Pool" by residents of Greater Victoria.  Located only 10 minutes by automobile from Saanich's new Uptown Shopping Centre and only 300 meters from the Royal Oak Transit Exchange, which is served by 12 BC Transit routes, it is highly accessible to all residents of the Capital Regional District.

References

External links 
 Saanich Commonwealth Place
 The Bruce Hutchison Library
 Municipality of Saanich
 Capital Regional District of British Columbia
 Wikimapia page on Royal Oak Transit Exchange

1994 Commonwealth Games venues
Sports venues in British Columbia
Saanich, British Columbia
Swimming venues in British Columbia